Koloi (also known as Kalai or Koloy) is one  of Tripuri clan in Tripura state of India. They are mainly dwelling in the West Tripura districts. They speak the language  Kokborok (Tripuri) which is of Tibeto-Burmese origin.

Notable People 

 Kamal Koloi, current Executive Member of TTAADC . He was the former Editor-in-Chief of Kok Tripura. 
 Debabrata Koloi, Politician was the former CEM of TTAADC for a short brief period during IPFT government between 2000 to 2005.
 Elizabeth Koloi, Kokborok singer & actress.

See also
 Tripuri people
 Kokborok
 Tripuri Dances
 List of Scheduled Tribes in India

References 

Scheduled Tribes of India
Ethnic groups in Tripura
West Tripura district